Krasovsky may refer to:
Krasovsky ellipsoid
Krasovskii–LaSalle principle
Krasovskiy (crater)

People with the surname
Anton Krasovsky (born 1975), Russian journalist, television personality and propagandist
Feodosy Krasovsky (1878-1948), Russian/Soviet astronomer and geodesist
Nikolay Krasovsky (1924-2012), Russian mathematician who worked in the mathematical theory of control, the theory of dynamical systems and the theory of differential games
Oleksiy Krasovsky (born 1994), Ukrainian cross-country skier
Vasili Krasovsky (1782–1824), Russian writer
Roman (Krassovsky) (born 1959), Archimandrite of the Russian Orthodox Church Outside Russia and chief of the Russian Ecclesiastical Mission in Jerusalem
Vladimir Krassovsky (born 1950), choir director of Holy Virgin Cathedral in San Francisco

See also
 

Russian-language surnames
Ukrainian-language surnames